The Saenger Theatre, also known as the Saenger Theater, is a historic theater in Pensacola, Florida. It is located at 118 South Palafox Place. On July 19, 1976, it was added to the U.S. National Register of Historic Places.

In 1989, the Saenger Theater was listed in A Guide to Florida's Historic Architecture, published by the University of Florida Press.

History 

The theatre, often referred to as the Grand Dame of Palafox was first built in 1925 and was designed by architect Emile Weil in the style known as Spanish Baroque architecture. This style was selected due to the extensive Spanish history of the Pensacola area. Mr. Weil is also known for designing theaters in Mobile, Alabama, as well as New Orleans and Shreveport, both of Louisiana.

Construction began at 118 South Palafox and opened in 1925. The back of the theater uses bricks from the Pensacola Opera House, which stood at the corner of Jefferson and Government Streets, but was destroyed in the 1916 hurricane. The ornate railing from the third-floor balcony, which was reserved for "ladies of the night" was also relocated from the opera house. The overall cost to build the Saenger was a total of $500,000 and was constructed by C.H. Turner Company, General Contractors.

The building not only featured a Robert Morton organ which currently is in reconstruction, but also 2,250 leather-backed seats, extravagant chandeliers and more than eight pounds of silver for its silver screen. The Saenger also boasted using "Dr. Mendenhall's new transvertical non-statical projectographic machine" as the projector.

Doors to the Saenger opened on April 2, 1925  to "The Star-Spangled Banner" followed by the "Dance of Old Seville," performed by a local dance class as well as a solo sung by yet another member of the community. The main event, which was Cecil B. DeMille's The Ten Commandments, was finally shown which completed their sold-out grand opening day.

The Saenger was host to a variety of entertainment. In addition to silent motion pictures, and later motion pictures with sound, Vaudeville and Broadway shows were frequent favorites. Local entertainers were also invited to perform at the elite Saenger.

During World War II, the theater stayed opened twenty-four hours a day so that local citizens were able to watch newsreels at any time of the day, or night.

As the years passed, the illustrious theater began to fall out of favor due to competition with drive-ins, as well as other factors, and slowly fell into disrepair. Like so many other palatial movie houses, the Saenger sadly suffered from lack of interest.

1975 brought sadness as the doors to the once magnificent Saenger closed; however, it was not forgotten. The theater was donated to the City of Pensacola who, with the combined efforts of the University of West Florida, worked to restore her to her original majestic structure. In 1981, her first grand re-opening took place alongside a performance by "The Duke Ellington Orchestra," a well renowned jazz ensemble.

More recently, the theater underwent another renovation totaling over $15 million, exceeding original estimates by nearly $5 million. The latest renovation was to extend the stage as well as enlarge the dressing rooms. The seating was to become more spacious and comfortable as well. This second grand re-opening took place on March 26, 2009 to "Jesus Christ Superstar."

Today the structure remains at its original location on the Northeastern corner of South Palafox Place and East Intendencia Street and continues to provide a variety of entertainment as in its older days.

See also
Saenger Theatre (Mobile, Alabama)
Saenger Theatre (New Orleans)

References

External links
 Escambia County listings at National Register of Historic Places
 Florida's Office of Cultural and Historical Programs
 Escambia County listings
 Saenger Theatre
 Pensacola Saenger Theater History

Gallery

Buildings and structures in Pensacola, Florida
National Register of Historic Places in Escambia County, Florida
Theatres on the National Register of Historic Places in Florida
Movie palaces
Saenger theatres
Emile Weil buildings
Tourist attractions in Pensacola, Florida
Theatres completed in 1925
Spanish Baroque architecture
Public venues with a theatre organ